Kyle Nelson (born October 3, 1986) is an American football long snapper who is a free agent. He played college football at New Mexico State University. He was signed by the New Orleans Saints as an undrafted free agent in 2011.

Early years
He attended China Spring High School for his senior year where he started at tight end and was the team's long snapper on special teams.

College career
He played College football at New Mexico State as the backup Tight end, Fullback and Long snapper.

Professional career

New Orleans Saints
On July 27, 2011, he signed with the New Orleans Saints as an undrafted free agent. On September 3, 2011, he was released. On September 4, he was signed to the practice squad. On September 5, he was released from the practice squad.

Kansas City Chiefs
On September 7, 2011, he signed with the Kansas City Chiefs to join the practice squad.

San Francisco 49ers
On January 11, 2012, he was signed to a future contract. On September 1, 2012, he was released.

Philadelphia Eagles
On September 25, 2012, he signed with the Philadelphia Eagles to join the practice squad. On October 2, 2012, he was released from the practice squad.

San Diego Chargers
On November 20, 2012, he was signed after the team placed Long snapper Mike Windt on the season-ending Injured Reserve due to a wrist injury. During the 2012 season with the Chargers he appeared in six games. He was released from the Chargers in May 2013.

Second stint with 49ers
On May 22, 2013, it was announced Nelson was signed to 49ers for a second stint to compete with Brian Jennings for the Long snapper position. He was later released on July 10, 2013.

Seattle Seahawks
On July 11, 2013, Nelson was claimed off waivers by the Seattle Seahawks after releasing Wide receiver Charly Martin. On August 26, 2013, he was cut by the Seahawks.

Washington Redskins
The Washington Redskins signed Nelson on October 15, 2013 to replace Nick Sundberg, who was put on injured reserve. The Redskins waived him on July 21, 2014.

Third stint with 49ers
On July 25, 2014, Nelson re-signed with the 49ers on a one-year deal. The 49ers signed him to a four-year contract extension on March 6, 2015. On December 4, 2018, Nelson was suspended 10 games for using performance-enhancing substances. He missed the final four games of the season and the suspension carried over to the 2019 season.

On March 12, 2019, Nelson signed a four-year contract extension with the 49ers. After missing the first six games of the 2019 season, he was reinstated from suspension on October 21, 2019, and was activated on October 26. The 49ers reached Super Bowl LIV, but they lost 31-20 to the Kansas City Chiefs.

On September 30, 2020, Nelson was released from the 49ers.

Arizona Cardinals
On November 10, 2021, Nelson was signed to the Arizona Cardinals practice squad. He was released on November 30.

Indianapolis Colts
On December 31, 2021, Nelson was signed to the Indianapolis Colts practice squad. He was released on January 3, 2022.

Los Angeles Rams
On October 14, 2022, Nelson signed with the practice squad of the Los Angeles Rams. He was terminated from his practice squad contract three days later.

Personal life
His grandfather Roger Nelson was selected in the 14th round, 164 overall in the 1954 NFL Draft by the Washington Redskins but played 13 years in the Canadian Football League for the Edmonton Eskimos. His father, Mark Nelson, also played seven years in the Canadian Football League, and is currently the special team coordinator of the Toronto Argonauts.

References

External links
New Mexico State Aggies bio

1986 births
Living people
American football long snappers
American football tight ends
Arizona Cardinals players
Kansas City Chiefs players
Los Angeles Rams players
New Mexico State Aggies football players
New Orleans Saints players
Philadelphia Eagles players
Players of American football from Texas
San Diego Chargers players
San Francisco 49ers players
Seattle Seahawks players
Sportspeople from Waco, Texas
Washington Redskins players